The mixed team badminton event at the 2014 Commonwealth Games was held from July 24 to July 28 at the Emirates Arena in Glasgow.

The teams were drawn into group stage draw. The top team in each group along with the two best runners-up advanced to the knockout round. The draw for the competition was done on July 21, 2014.

This was Malaysia's third consecutive gold medal in the mixed team event at the Commonwealth Games. England took silver for the second time and Singapore took bronze, their first medal ever in the mixed team event.

Seedings
The seeding list was based on July 3, 2014 world rankings as the draw was conducted on July 21, 2014.

The knock out draw was held immediately after the group stage was completed.

Group stage

Pool A

Pool B

Pool C

Pool D

Pool E

Pool F

Knockout stage

Quarterfinals

Semifinals

Bronze medal

Final

References

Team
Commonwealth